August Dietz (October 19, 1869 – September 26, 1963) was a philatelist, editor and publisher, who specialized in the study of mail and postal history of the Confederate States of America.

Early life
Dietz was born in Prussia on October 19, 1869. He moved to Richmond, Virginia, in the United States in 1871, and began his collecting of postage stamps in 1888.

He died September 26, 1963, in Richmond, Virginia.

Philatelic career
Because he was a trained lithographer and typographer, and because he had access to some of the postal sources of the Confederate States of America, he became interested in the postage and philatelic history of the Confederate States.

Today he is regarded as the Father of Confederate Philately.

He established himself in Richmond at 900 West Clay Street, Station A, Richmond, Virginia.

Editor and Publisher
The Dietz publishing chronology:
 1896 – editor of the Virginia Philatelist, a monthly philatelic magazine published in Richmond.
 1901 – formed his own company, Dietz Printing Company
 1924 – commenced writing articles on Confederate philately.
 1924-29 – published The Southern Philatelist
1929-33 – published The New South Philatelist
 1931 – published Dietz Confederate States Catalog and Handbook (expanded and reissued in 1937, 1945, and 1959 – expanded and published in 1986 as Specialized Catalog of the Postage Stamps of the Confederate States of America.)
 1933-36 – published Stamp and Cover Collecting
 1937-39 – published Stamp and Cover Collectors Review
 1929 – published his famous The Postal Service of the Confederate States of America

Writings
Dietz was considered an expert in Confederate philately and wrote widely on the subject. Some of his studies included:
 The engraver of the Five Cents De La Rue
 The South's "Way of Life" - Random Notes for the Student of Confederates
 The Confederate States Post-Office Department, its stamps & stationery

Honors
Dietz received numerous honors including:
 1938 – awarded the Lindenberg Medal by the Berlin Philatelic Club
 1940 – awarded the first Luff Award by the American Philatelic Society for Exceptional Contributions to Philately
 1948 – awarded the honorary title of “General” by Confederate Stamp Alliance
 1955 – awarded the Lichtenstein Medal by the Collectors Club of New York
 1964 - inducted into the American Philatelic Society Hall of Fame

The August Dietz Award
The August Dietz Award is named in honor of the Founding Father and first President (1935–1939) of the Confederate Stamp Alliance. It is presented for distinguished research and writing in the field of Confederate philately. From 1962 through 1978 the award was presented for articles printed in the Confederate Philatelist. After 1978, the criteria were modified to include any article or publication in the field of Confederate philately.

See also
 Postage stamps and postal history of the Confederate States
 Presidents of the United States on U.S. postage stamps, Civil War era
 Philately
 Philatelic literature
 The Stamp Specialist

References
 Philatelic Database – August Dietz
 August A. Dietz, Sr.
 August Dietz Award
 History of the Confederate States Catalog and Handbook

1869 births
1963 deaths
Philatelic literature
American publishers (people)
American philatelists
Businesspeople from Richmond, Virginia
Recipients of the Lindenberg Medal
German emigrants to the United States
American Philatelic Society